Out of the Darkness is the first solo album by the American guitarist Jack Starr, originally released in 1984 through Passport Records in the US.  A 30-year anniversary edition was issued by German label Limb Music in early 2014.

The song "False Messiah" was covered by American power metal band Jag Panzer on their Age of Mastery album in 1998.

Track listing
All songs by Jack Starr

 "Concrete Warrior" – 4:17
 "False Messiah" – 5:40
 "Scorcher" – 1:52
 "Wild in the Streets" – 2:34
 "Can't Let You Walk Away" – 4:52
 "Chains of Love"  – 3:30
 "Eyes of Fire" – 2:46
 "Odile" (instrumental) – 4:44
 "Let's Get Crazy Again" – 3:26
 "Amazing Grace" – 1:31 (CD bonus track)

Odile is the name of Jack Starr's wife at the time of recording the album.

Personnel
Rhett Forrester - vocals
Jack Starr - guitar
Gary Bordonaro - bass
Carl Canedy  - drums

Guest musicians
Gary Driscoll - drums on track 9
Emma Zale - additional vocals on track 2, piano and strings on tracks 5, 8
Paul Kane - guitar on track 5
Laura Kyle - backing vocals on tracks 5, 7
Ned Meloni - bass on track 8
David DeFeis - backing vocals (uncredited)

Technical personnel
Chris Bubacz, Denny McNerney - engineers

References 

1984 albums
Music for Nations albums
Roadrunner Records albums
Passport Records albums